In statistical quality control, the CUsUM (or cumulative sum control chart) is a sequential analysis technique developed by E. S. Page of the University of Cambridge. It is typically used for monitoring change detection.
CUSUM was announced in Biometrika, in 1954, a few years after the publication of Wald's sequential probability ratio test (SPRT).

E. S. Page referred to a "quality number" , by which he meant a parameter of the probability distribution; for example, the mean. He devised CUSUM as a method to determine changes in it, and proposed a criterion for deciding when to take corrective action. When the CUSUM method is applied to changes in mean, it can be used for step detection of a time series.

Method
As its name implies, CUSUM involves the calculation of a cumulative sum (which is what makes it "sequential"). Samples from a process  are assigned weights , and summed as follows:

When the value of S exceeds a certain threshold value, a change in value has been found. The above formula only detects changes in the positive direction. When negative changes need to be found as well, the min operation should be used instead of the max operation, and this time a change has been found when the value of S is below the (negative) value of the threshold value.

Page did not explicitly say that  represents the likelihood function, but this is common usage.

Note that this differs from SPRT by always using zero function as the lower "holding barrier" rather than a lower "holding barrier". Also, CUSUM does not require the use of the likelihood function.

As a means of assessing CUSUM's performance, Page defined the average run length (A.R.L.) metric; "the expected number of articles sampled before action is taken." He further wrote:

When  the  quality  of  the output  is  satisfactory  the A.R.L.  is  a measure  of  the expense incurred by the scheme when it gives false alarms, i.e., Type I errors (Neyman & Pearson, 1936).  On  the other  hand,  for  constant  poor  quality  the A.R.L.  measures  the delay and thus  the amount of scrap produced before the rectifying action is taken,  i.e., Type II errors.

Example
The following example shows 20 observations  of a process with a mean of 0 and a standard deviation of 0.5.

From the  column, it can be seen that  never deviates by 3 standard deviations, so simply alerting on a high deviation will not detect a failure, whereas CUSUM shows that the  value exceeds 4 at the 17th observation.

where  is a critical level parameter (tunable, same as threshold T) that's used to adjust the sensitivity of change detection: larger  makes CUSUM less sensitive to the change and vice versa.

Variants

Cumulative observed-minus-expected plots  are a related method.

References

Further reading
 
 Mishra, S., Vanli, O. A., & Park, C (2015). "A Multivariate Cumulative Sum Method for Continuous Damage Monitoring with Lamb-wave Sensors", International Journal of Prognostics and Health Management,

External links
"Engineering Statistics Handbook - Cusum Control Charts" 

Statistical charts and diagrams
Quality control tools
Sequential methods